In mathematics, specifically group theory, the free product is an operation that takes two groups G and H and constructs a new   The result contains both G and H as subgroups, is generated by the elements of these subgroups, and is the “universal” group having these properties, in the sense that any two homomorphisms from G and H into a group K factor uniquely through a homomorphism from  to K.  Unless one of the groups G and H is trivial, the free product is always infinite.  The construction of a free product is similar in spirit to the construction of a free group (the universal group with a given set of generators).

The free product is the coproduct in the category of groups. That is, the free product plays the same role in group theory that disjoint union plays in set theory, or that the direct sum plays in module theory. Even if the groups are commutative, their free product is not, unless one of the two groups is the trivial group. Therefore, the free product is not the coproduct in the category of abelian groups.

The free product is important in algebraic topology because of van Kampen's theorem, which states that the fundamental group of the union of two path-connected topological spaces whose intersection is also path-connected is always an amalgamated free product of the fundamental groups of the spaces.  In particular, the fundamental group of the wedge sum of two spaces (i.e. the space obtained by joining two spaces together at a single point) is simply the free product of the fundamental groups of the spaces.

Free products are also important in Bass–Serre theory, the study of groups acting by automorphisms on trees.  Specifically, any group acting with finite vertex stabilizers on a tree may be constructed from finite groups using amalgamated free products and HNN extensions.  Using the action of the modular group on a certain tessellation of the hyperbolic plane, it follows from this theory that the modular group is isomorphic to the free product of cyclic groups of orders 4 and 6 amalgamated over a cyclic group of order 2.

Construction
If G and H are groups, a word in G and H is a product of the form

where each si is either an element of G or an element of H.  Such a word may be reduced using the following operations:
 Remove an instance of the identity element (of either G or H).
 Replace a pair of the form g1g2 by its product in G, or a pair h1h2 by its product in H.
Every reduced word is an alternating product of elements of G and elements of H, e.g.

The free product G ∗ H is the group whose elements are the reduced words in G and H, under the operation of concatenation followed by reduction.

For example, if G is the infinite cyclic group , and H is the infinite cyclic group , then every element of G ∗ H is an alternating product of powers of x with powers of y.  In this case, G ∗ H is isomorphic to the free group generated by x and y.

Presentation
Suppose that

is a presentation for G (where SG is a set of generators and RG is a set of relations), and suppose that

is a presentation for H.  Then
 
That is, G ∗ H is generated by the generators for G together with the generators for H, with relations consisting of the relations from G together with the relations from H (assume here no notational clashes so that these are in fact disjoint unions).

Examples
For example, suppose that G is a cyclic group of order 4,

and H is a cyclic group of order 5

Then G ∗ H is the infinite group

Because there are no relations in a free group, the free product of free groups is always a free group.  In particular,

where Fn denotes the free group on n generators.

Another example is the modular group . It is isomorphic to the free product of two cyclic groups

Generalization: Free product with amalgamation
The more general construction of free product with amalgamation is correspondingly a special kind of pushout in the same category.

 and 

where  is some arbitrary group. Start with the free product  and adjoin as relations

This is the construction needed to compute the fundamental group of two connected spaces joined along a path-connected subspace, with  taking the role of the fundamental group of the subspace. See: Seifert–van Kampen theorem. 

Karrass and Solitar have given a description of the subgroups of a free product with amalgamation.

Free products with amalgamation and a closely related notion of HNN extension are basic building blocks in Bass–Serre theory of groups acting on trees.

In other branches
One may similarly define free products of other algebraic structures than groups, including algebras over a field.  Free products of algebras of random variables play the same role in defining "freeness" in the theory of free probability that Cartesian products play in defining statistical independence in classical probability theory.

See also
Direct product of groups
Coproduct
Graph of groups
Kurosh subgroup theorem
Normal form for free groups and free product of groups
Universal property

Notes

References
 
 
 Categories and Groupoids, by Philip Higgins

Group products
Algebraic topology
Free algebraic structures